Gabriel Saez (born February 1, 1988 in Port Darien, Panama) is a Panamanian horse racing jockey.  He began his riding career in his native country in 2004, becoming the leading apprentice jockey in 2005.  Saez moved to the United States in February 2006, and almost instantly became Delaware Park Racetrack's leading jockey that same year.  He won his first race as an apprentice in the U.S., and then his first race as a journeyman.

Career

2008
Gabriel rode Eight Belles in the 2008 Kentucky Derby and came under sharp criticism when Eight Belles was euthanized after she'd crossed the finish line, a very game second to Big Brown.  In cool-down, she collapsed due to fractures in both front ankles.  In a letter to the Kentucky Racing Authority, PETA claimed that the horse was "doubtlessly" injured during the race, and therefore Saez bore some responsibility for the injury and euthanization.

Eight Belles' trainer, Larry Jones, has vigorously defended Saez, saying "We have photographs 50 to 70 yards from where this happened and the horse had her ears up . . . If this horse had anything going on with her at the time, she didn't know it. If the horse never had a clue, there's no way the jockey could have had a clue."

The Kentucky Horse Racing Authority did not find any evidence of wrongdoing by Saez.

Saez won the horseraceinsider.com "I've Got Your PETA Right Here Insider Award" in 2008 for achieving a redemptive moment with his dramatically heady victory aboard Eclipse finalist Proud Spell in Saratoga's Alabama Stakes.

The day before the Kentucky Derby, Saez rode Proud Spell to a win in the Kentucky Oaks.

2009
Saez entered the 2009 Kentucky Derby aboard prerace favorite Friesan Fire and finished 18th. At the 2009 Preakness Stakes, Saez again jockeyed Friesan Fire, and finished 10th.

Year-end charts

References

External links
 Gabriel Saez at the NTRA

1988 births
Panamanian jockeys
American jockeys
Living people
People from Darién Province
Panamanian emigrants to the United States